Culama glauca is a moth in the family Cossidae. It was described by Kallies and D.J. Hilton in 2012. It is found in Australia, where it has been recorded from Western Australia and New South Wales. The habitat consists of dry woodlands, mallee and heath.

The ground colour of the forewings are light grey with black lines and strigulae. The hindwings are white to light grey.

The larvae possibly feed on Eucalyptus populnea and Eucalyptus camaldulensis.

Etymology
The species name refers to the olive green scales at the base of the forewing and is derived from glauca (meaning greyish green).

References

Natural History Museum Lepidoptera generic names catalog

External links

Cossinae
Endemic fauna of Australia
Moths described in 2012
Moths of Australia